Kīkaṭa was an ancient Indian kingdom in what is now India, mentioned in the Vedas.

A section in the Rigveda (RV 3.53.14) refers to the Kīkaṭas, with its ruler Pramangada. Some scholars have placed them in Bihar (Magadha) because Kikata is used as synonym for Magadha in the later texts; while other scholars dispute this and point to evidence for a more western location, in the area approximately south of Kurukshetra (see below). Like the Magadhas in the Atharvaveda, the Rigveda speaks of the Kikatas as a hostile tribe, living on the borders of Vedic India, who did not perform Vedic rituals.

Zimmer has argued, in referring to Yaksha, that they were a non-Aryan people. According to Weber, they were a Vedic people, but were sometimes in conflict with other Vedic people.

Location 
Placement of Kikata in Magadha is challenged by some scholars such as the historical geographers Mithila Sharan Pandey (who argues they must have been near Western Uttar Pradesh), and O.P. Bharadwaj (who places them near the Sarasvati River), historian Ram Sharan Sharma, who believes they were probably in Haryana, and Michael Witzel who places them south of Kurukshetra, in Eastern Rajasthan or western Madhya Pradesh, and his assertion that the Magadha is beyond the geographical horizon of Rigveda.

References in texts 
The names, Kitava and Kitika, closely resemble Kikata, and were found in the Mahabharata.

The Ajas, the Prishnis, the Sikatas, the Arunas, and the Kitavas, have all gone to heaven through the merit of Vedic study (12:26).

The Abhishahas, the Surasenas, the Sivis, and the Vasatis, the Swalyas, the Matsyas, the Amvashtas, the Trigartas, and the Kekayas, the Sauviras, the Kitavas, and the dwellers of the Eastern, Western, and the Northern countries,--these twelve brave races were resolved to fight reckless of the lives for Bhishma(6:18). The Sauviras, the Kitavas, the Easterners, the Westerners, the Northerners, the Malavas, the Abhishahas, the Surasenas, the Sivis, and the Vasatis were mentioned as taking part in Kurukshetra War siding with the Kauravas (6:107). The Sauviras, the Kitavas, the Easterners, the Westerners, the Northerners, the Malavas, the Abhishahas, the Surasenas, the Sivis, the Vasatis, the Salwas, the Sayas, the Trigartas, the Amvashthas, and the Kaikeyas were again mentioned on the Kaurava side at (6:120).

The tribes Vairamas, Paradas, Tungas, with the Kitavas who lived upon crops that depended on water from the sky or of the river and also they who were born in regions on the sea-shore, in woodlands, or countries on the other side of the ocean waited at the gate, being refused permission to enter, with goats and kine and asses and camels and vegetable, honey and blankets and jewels and gems of various kinds. -- bringing tribute to Pandava king Yudhishthira (2:50).

Madraka, and Karnaveshta, Siddhartha, and also Kitaka; Suvira, and Suvahu, and Mahavira, and also Valhika, Kratha, Vichitra, Suratha, and the handsome king Nila were mentioned as kings at (1:67).

Kikata (कीकट) is mentioned in Mahabharata (VIII.30.45)....."The Karasakaras, the Mahishakas, the Kalingas, the Kikatas, the Atavis, the Karkotakas, the Virakas, and other peoples of no religion, one should always avoid."

Like Rigveda attributes of Kikatas, Atharvaveda also speaks about south eastern tribes like Magadhas and Angas as hostile tribe who lived on the borders of Brahmanical India. According to Puranic literature Kikata is placed near Gaya. It is described as extending from Caran-adri to Gridharakuta (vulture peak), Rajgir.

List of Rulers
Known Notable Rulers were-

King Kitaka
Pramangada
Suvira
Suvahu
Mahavira
Valhika
Kratha
Vichitra
Suratha
Nila
Madraka
Karnaveshta
Siddhartha

See also 
Janapada
Mahajanapada
RigVeda
Mahabharata & Vyasa
Historical Vedic Religion

References 

Kingdoms in the Mahabharata
History of Bihar
Kingdoms of Bihar
Former kingdoms